Christopher or Chris Wade may refer to:

Chris Wade (fighter) (born 1987), American mixed martial artist
Chris Wade (real estate broker) (born 1945), American real estate broker involved in the Whitewater controversy
Chris Wade (writer), 20th-21st century English writer, musician and filmmaker
Chris Wade, producer of Chapo Trap House
Christopher Wade (died 1555), English Protestant martyr